Mamasa is an Austronesian language spoken in West Sulawesi, Indonesia. This language is the native language of the Mamasa people which is related to the Toraja people.

Dialects 
Three dialects can be distinguished:
Northern Mamasa
Central Mamasa
Pattae'
Speakers of Pattae' are a culturally distinct ethnic group traditionally more affiliated to the Mandar people than to speakers of the Northern and Central Mamasa dialects in the interior, and for that reason Pattae' is considered by its speakers to be a language separate from Mamasa proper (i.e. Northern and Central Mamasa).

Phonology 
Mamasa has the following consonants and vowels:

References

Further reading 

Languages of Sulawesi
South Sulawesi languages